The South Africa Sevens is an annual rugby sevens tournament that is held in South Africa. It is currently hosted in Cape Town and is part of the Sevens World Series run by World Rugby. A South African leg of the World series has been included in every edition of the competition since it began in the 1999-2000 season.

The tournament was first held at Stellenbosch in 1999 before being moved to Durban for the next two seasons. For nine seasons from 2002 until 2010 it was held at George in the Western Cape, before moving to Port Elizabeth for the 2011 edition, and Cape Town in 2015.

Results

See also
 South Africa Women's Sevens

References

External links 
South African Rugby Union
World Rugby Sevens Series

 
World Rugby Sevens Series tournaments
Rugby sevens competitions in South Africa
Recurring sporting events established in 1999
1999 establishments in South Africa